The Royal Norfolk and Suffolk Yacht Club is a private yacht club based in Lowestoft in Suffolk. It was founded on 9 April 1859.

External links
Official Website
History at SailingNetworks.com

Royal yacht clubs
1859 establishments in England
Yacht clubs in England
George Skipper buildings
Grade II* listed buildings in Suffolk
Lowestoft